Manasse Ninakku Mangalam is a 1984 Indian Malayalam-language film, directed by A. B. Raj and produced by Lekshmi (Thripurasundari). The film stars Prem Nazir, Madhu, Menaka and Balan K. Nair in the lead roles. The film has musical score by Raveendran.

Cast 
Prem Nazir
Madhu
Menaka.. Shobha
Ranipadmini... Geetha
Balan K. Nair
Lalu Alex... Soman

Soundtrack 
The music was composed by Raveendran and the lyrics were written by Poovachal Khader.

References

External links 
 

1984 films
1980s Malayalam-language films
Films directed by A. B. Raj